Acrolophus uncispinis is a moth of the family Acrolophidae. It was described by Lord Walsingham in 1915.

References

uncispinis
Moths described in 1915